This Fire may refer to:
 This Fire (album), a 1996 album from Paula Cole
 "This Fire" (Franz Ferdinand song), 2004
 This Fire (Birds of Tokyo EP), 2012
 "This Fire" (Birds of Tokyo song), 2012
 "This Fire", a song by Killswitch Engage, from the album As Daylight Dies